This is a list of notable footballers who have played for Swindon Town F.C. Generally, this means players that have played 100 or more first-class matches for the club. However, some players are included who have played fewer matches but made significant contributions to the club's history (e.g. Macari, Austin, Hoddle, McMahon and Fjørtoft).

For a list of all Swindon Town players, major or minor, with a Wikipedia article, see :Category:Swindon Town F.C. players
For current players see Swindon Town F.C. Current squad
For player and club records see Swindon Town F.C. records

Players are listed in alphabetical order. Appearances and goals are for first-team competitive matches only (including Cup matches). Substitute appearances included.

Statistics correct as of 11 January 2020.

References

Players
 
Swindon Town F.C.
Association football player non-biographical articles
Swindon Town